Yeleğen is a belde (town) in Eşme district of Uşak Province, Turkey. It is one of the westernmost settlements of the province.

Geography 

Demographics 
The population of the town is 2460 as of 2011. Yeleğen residents are of Turkmen origin from Germiyan Beylik era in the 14th century. Çakal Turcomans live there. Avşar Turcoman are one of the 24 Oghuz Family branches and Çakal Yorukhs connect to Avşars in Turkish History.

History 
The original settlement was completely burned during the Greek retreat in the Turkish War of Independence (1922). The settlement was declared a seat of township in 1964.

Economy 
The main activity is vegetable agriculture.

References

Populated places in Uşak Province
Towns in Turkey
Eşme District